A Maze of Stars is a science fiction novel by John Brunner. It was first published in the United States by Ballantine Del Rey Books in 1991.  It tells the story of a great sentient ship charged with protecting human settlements on other worlds.

References

1991 British novels
1991 science fiction novels
American science fiction novels
Novels by John Brunner
Del Rey books